Permude is a village (panchayat) located in the Mangalore taluk, Dakshina Kannada district, in Karnataka state, India. The name, "Permude", derived from Perda Mudde (Tulu Language), is a reference to the milk that was once locally produced in large quantities. Permude is located approximately 360 kilometers from the state capital, Bangalore. Nearby villages include Bajpe and Kinnigoli. According to 2011 census information, Permude's location code or village code is 617478. The village comprises an area of 742.69 hectares. Permude falls under the Mangalore Special Economic Zone (MSEZ).

Inhabitants 

The Kudubis, who reside in Permude, are an Adivasi community. Their customs are similar to other tribes of central India. In 2011 the Kudubi people opposed the MSEZ operating company's attempt to construct a boundary wall on land the company had acquired in Permude. The construction was opposed as a result of reported damage to farms and crops caused by the construction.

Banks and financial institutions 

 Canara Bank (ATM)
 Corporation Bank (ATM)
Syndicate Bank (ATM), Bajpe
Vijaya Bank (ATM), Bajpe

Schools and educational institutions 

 Government Urdu Primary School
 St.Francis Xavier Higher Primary School/ Yekkar

Religious institutions

Temples 
 Shree Durgaparameshwari Temple, Kateel
 Ayyappa Bajana Mandir
 Shree Shanishwara Temple
 Shree Somanatheshawara Temple

Churches 
St John the Baptist Church, Permude

Mosques 
 Jamiya Masjid
 Minara Masjid
Badriya Juma Masjid
Usmaniya Mohammedi Masjid

Clubs 

 Royal Friends Club
 Jamiya Cricketers

Transportation 

 The nearest railway station to Permude is Tokur, which is 7.3 km away.
 Mangalore Central railway station is 20.6 km away.
 The nearest airport to Permude is Mangalore International Airport, 5.8 km away.
 Bajpe bus stand, 3.2 KM

References

Villages in Dakshina Kannada district